Nicholas James Schommer (born January 3, 1986, in Red Wing, Minnesota) is a former American football safety. He was drafted by the Tennessee Titans in the seventh round of the 2009 NFL Draft. He played college football at North Dakota State.

College career
Schommer attended North Dakota State University after attending Prescott High School in Prescott, Wisconsin. At North Dakota State he was named a FCS third-team All-American.

Professional career
Schommer was drafted by the Tennessee Titans in the seventh round of the 2009 NFL Draft, becoming the 25th North Dakota State graduate to be drafted in either the NFL Draft or CFL Draft. He was waived on September 4. Schommer was then signed to be a member of the practice squad.

After his practice squad contract expired following the 2009 season, Schommer was re-signed to a future contract on January 5, 2010. He was waived by Tennessee on August 29, 2011.

References

External links
Tennessee Titans bio

1986 births
Living people
American football safeties
North Dakota State Bison baseball players
North Dakota State Bison football players
People from Red Wing, Minnesota
People from Prescott, Wisconsin
Players of American football from Minnesota
Players of American football from Wisconsin
Sportspeople from the Minneapolis–Saint Paul metropolitan area
Tennessee Titans players